Giovanni dei Porcari (died 1486) was a Roman Catholic prelate who served as Bishop of Lacedonia (1481–1486).

Biography
On 27 August 1481, Giovanni dei Porcari was appointed during the papacy of Pope Sixtus IV as Bishop of Lacedonia.
He served as Bishop of Lacedonia until his death in 1486.

References

External links and additional sources
 (for Chronology of Bishops) 
 (for Chronology of Bishops) 

15th-century Italian Roman Catholic bishops
Bishops appointed by Pope Sixtus IV
1486 deaths